Esther is a 1916 British silent historical film directed by Maurice Elvey and starring Elisabeth Risdon, Fred Groves and Charles Rock. The film portrays the biblical story of Esther.

Cast
 Elisabeth Risdon as Esther 
 Fred Groves as Haman 
 Charles Rock as Mordecai 
 Ruth Mackay as Vashti 
 Franklin Dyall
 Guy Newall
 Beatrix Templeton

References

Bibliography
 Murphy, Robert. Directors in British and Irish Cinema: A Reference Companion. British Film Institute, 2006.

External links
 

1916 films
British historical drama films
British silent feature films
1910s English-language films
Films directed by Maurice Elvey
1910s historical drama films
British black-and-white films
1916 drama films
1910s British films
Silent historical drama films